Peronism, also called justicialism, is an Argentine political movement based on the ideas and legacy of Argentine ruler Juan Perón (1895–1974). It has been an influential movement in 20th and 21st century Argentine politics. Since 1946, Peronists have won 10 out of the 13 presidential elections in which they have been allowed to run. The main Peronist party is the Justicialist Party. The policies of Peronist presidents have differed greatly, but the general ideology has been described as "a vague blend of nationalism and labourism" or populism. 

Perón became Argentina's labour secretary after participating in the 1943 military coup and was elected president of Argentina in 1946. He introduced social programs that benefited the working class, supported labor unions and called for additional involvement of the state in the economy. In addition, he helped industrialists. Perón was hugely popular and gained even more admiration through his wife Eva, who championed for the rights of migrant workers and was beloved by the people. 

Eva was so beloved that, in 1949, Juan Perón formed the Female Peronist Party, a new wing within his own party under her leadership. Due to rising inflation and other economic problems and political repression, the military overthrew Perón in 1955. The Peronist party was banned and it was not until 1973 that open elections were held again in which Perón was re-elected president. 

Perón died the next year; his widow and vice president Isabel took over the presidency.  

Perón's death left an intense power vacuum and the military promptly overthrew Isabel in 1976. Following the return to democracy in 1983 Peronist candidates dominated the presidency. In 37 years of democracy, Peronists held the presidency for 24 years.

Carlos Menem was elected in 1989 and served for two consecutive terms over ten years. His main focus was the privatization of state run enterprises, the adoption of free-market policies and good international relations with the United States. After the De La Rúa administration collapsed, two interim Peronist leaders took over: Adolfo Rodríguez Saá and later Eduardo Duhalde. Left-wing Peronist Néstor Kirchner, elected in 2003, served for only one term, while his wife, Cristina Fernández de Kirchner, served two (having been elected in 2007 and re-elected in 2011), and is, since 2019, the current vice president with Alberto Fernández as president.

Peronism is considered a paternalistic ideology. Some scholars evaluate Peronism as a mixture of 'militant laborism' and 'traditional conservatism'. However, supporters of Peronism see it as socially progressivism.

Overview 

The pillars of the Peronist ideal, known as the "three flags", are social justice, economic independence, and political sovereignty. Peronism can be described as a third position ideology as it rejects both capitalism and communism. Peronism espouses corporatism and thus aims to mediate tensions between the classes of society, with the state responsible for negotiating compromise in conflicts between managers and workers.

Peronism gained popularity in Argentina after the failure of its government to listen and recognize the needs of its middle class. As president of Argentina, Hipólito Yrigoyen did not listen to the workers' pleas for better wages and better working conditions after World War I. Yrigoyen was notorious for failing to oppose Argentina’s oligarchy. According to Teresa Meade in A History of Modern Latin America: 1800 to the Present, Yrigoyen failed "to establish a middle-class-based political system from 1916 to 1930 – mainly because his Radical Civic Union had neither the will nor the means to effectively oppose the dominance of the oligarchy". Many in power did not work to change the way things were. However, Juan Perón, at that time a military officer, used his experiences in Europe and his admiration for certain leaders like Mussolini to create a new political atmosphere that he felt would better the lives of citizens in Argentina. 

Unlike Yrigoyen, Perón "recognized that the industrial working class was not necessarily an impediment, and could be mobilized to serve as the basis for building a corporatist state that joined the interests of labor with those of at least a large section of the national bourgeoisie to promote a nationalist agenda".

From the perspective of its opponents, Peronism is an authoritarian ideology. Perón was often compared to fascist dictators, accused of demagoguery and his policies derided as populist. Proclaiming himself the embodiment of nationality, Perón's government often silenced dissent by accusing opponents of being unpatriotic, especially noticeable in his second term from 1952 to 1955, where these policies were intensified as a form of control in the face of crisis. The corporatist character of Peronism drew attacks from socialists who accused his administration of preserving capitalist exploitation and class division. Conservatives rejected its modernist ideology and felt their status threatened by the ascent of the Peronist apparat. Liberals condemned the Perón regime's arbitrariness and dictatorial tendencies. 

The Economist has called Peronism "an alliance between trade unions and the "caudillos" of the backward north".

Chilean senator Ignacio Walker has criticized Peronism as having "Fascistoid", "authoritarian" and "corporative" traits and a "perverse logic" considering this "the real wall between Chile and Argentina" and "not the Andes". 

Defenders of Peronism also describe the doctrine as populist, albeit in the sense that they believe it embodies the interests of the masses and in particular the most vulnerable social strata. Admirers hold Perón in esteem for his administration's anti-imperialism and non-alignment as well as its socially progressive initiatives. Amongst other measures introduced by Perón's governments, social security was made universal while education was made free to all who qualified and working students were given one paid week before every major examination. Vast low-income housing projects were created and paid vacations became standard. All workers (including white-collar employees) were guaranteed free medical care and half of their vacation-trip expenses and mothers-to-be received three paid months off prior to and after giving birth. Workers' recreation centers were also constructed throughout the country.

Ideology

Twenty Peronist Tenets 
From Peron's "Peronist Philosophy":
 "A true democracy is that one in which the government does what the people want and defends only one interest: the people's."
 "Peronism is essentially of the common people. Any political elite is anti-people, and thus, not Peronist."
 "A Peronist works for the movement. Whoever, in the name of Peronism, serves an elite or a leader, is a Peronist in name only."
 "For Peronism, there is only one class of person: those who work."
 "Working is a right that creates the dignity of men; and it's a duty, because it's fair that everyone should produce as much as they consume at the very least."
 "For a good Peronist, there is nothing better than another Peronist." (In 1973, after coming back from exile, in a conciliatory attempt, and in order to lessen the division in society, Peron reformed this tenet to: "For an Argentine, there is nothing better than another Argentine.")
 "No Peronist should feel more than what he is, nor less than what he should be. When a Peronist feels more than what he is, he begins to turn into an oligarch."
 "When it comes to political action, the scale of values of every Peronist is: Argentina first; the movement second; and thirdly, the individuals."
 "Politics are not an end, but a means for the well-being of Argentina: which means happiness for our children and greatness for our nation."
 "The two arms of Peronism are social justice and social help. With them, we can give a hug of justice and love to the people."
 "Peronism desires national unity and not struggle. It wants heroes, not martyrs."
 "Kids should be the only privileged class."
 "A government without doctrine is a body without soul. That's why Peronism has a political, economic and social doctrine: Justicialism."
 "Justicialism is a new philosophy of life: simple, practical, of the common people, and profoundly Christian and humanist."
 "As political doctrine, Justicialism balances the right of the individual and society."
 "As an economic doctrine, Justicialism proposes a social market, putting capital to the service of the economy and the well-being of the people."
 "As a social doctrine, Justicialism carries out social justice, which gives each person their rights in accordance to their social function."
 "Peronism wants an Argentina socially 'fair', economically 'free' and politically 'sovereign'."
 "We establish a centralized government, an organized State and a free people."
 "In this land, the best thing we have is our people."

Perón's policies

Socialism, nationalism, and populism

Perón's ideas were widely embraced by a variety of different groups in Argentina across the political spectrum. Some of Perón's personal views later became a burden on the ideology, such as his anti-clericalism, which did not strike a sympathetic chord with upper-class Argentinians.

Peronism is widely regarded as a form of corporate socialism, or "right-wing socialism". Perón's public speeches were consistently nationalist and populist. It would be difficult to separate Peronism from corporate nationalism, for Perón nationalized Argentina's large corporations, blurring distinctions between corporations and government. At the same time, the labor unions became corporate, ceding the right to strike in agreements with Perón as Secretary of Welfare in the military government from 1943–1945. In exchange, the state was to assume the role of negotiator between conflicting interests.

Peronism also lacked a strong interest in matters of foreign policy other than the belief that the political and economic influences of other nations should be kept out of Argentina—he was somewhat isolationist. Early in his presidency, Perón envisioned Argentina's role as a model for other countries in Latin America and proposed economical unions with the countries of this region, which was expressed with his phrase: "The 2000s will find us unionized or dominated", but such ideas were ultimately abandoned. Despite his oppositional rhetoric, Perón frequently sought cooperation with the United States government on various issues.

Attitudes towards Jews 

Argentina has had the largest Jewish population in Latin America since before Perón came to power. After becoming president, he invited members of the Jewish community to participate in his government. One of his advisors was José Ber Gelbard, a Jewish man from Poland. Peronism did not have an antisemitic bias. The Jewish Virtual Library writes that while Juan Perón had sympathized with the Axis powers, "Perón also expressed sympathy for Jewish rights and established diplomatic relations with Israel in 1949. Since then, more than 45,000 Jews have immigrated to Israel from Argentina".

In the book Inside Argentina from Perón to Menem, author Laurence Levine, also former president of the U.S.–Argentine Chamber of Commerce, writes that "although anti-Semitism existed in Argentina, Perón's own views and his political associations were not anti-Semitic". 

While Perón allowed many Nazi and other WWII-era Axis criminals to take refuge in Argentina, he also attracted many Jewish immigrants. Argentina has a Jewish population of over 200,000 citizens, one of the largest in the world.

Criticism of Perón's policies 
Political opponents maintain that Perón and his administration resorted to organised violence and dictatorial rule; that Perón showed contempt for any opponents, and regularly characterised them as traitors and agents of foreign powers. 

Perón subverted freedoms by nationalising the broadcasting system, centralising the unions under his control and monopolising the supply of newspaper print. At times, Perón also resorted to tactics such as illegally imprisoning opposition politicians and journalists, including Radical Civic Union leader Ricardo Balbin; and shutting down opposition papers, such as La Prensa.

Perón's admiration for Benito Mussolini is well documented. Many scholars categorise Peronism as a fascist ideology. Carlos Fayt believed that Peronism was "an Argentine implementation of Italian fascism". Hayes reaches the conclusion that "the Peronist movement produced a form of fascism that was distinctively Latin American".

One of the most vocal critics of Peronism was the Argentine writer Jorge Luis Borges. After Perón ascended to the presidency in 1946, Borges spoke before the Argentine Society of Writers (SADE) by saying: Dictatorships breed oppression, dictatorships breed servility, dictatorships breed cruelty; more loathsome still is the fact that they breed idiocy. Bellboys babbling orders, portraits of caudillos, prearranged cheers or insults, walls covered with names, unanimous ceremonies, mere discipline usurping the place of clear thinking[...] Fighting these sad monotonies is one of the duties of a writer. Need I remind readers of Martín Fierro or Don Segundo that individualism is an old Argentine virtue.

Peronism after Perón

Fall of Perón 
A military and civilian coup, the Revolución Libertadora, led by General Eduardo Lonardi, overthrew the Perón regime in 1955. During the coup, Lonardi drew analogies between Perón and Juan Manuel de Rosas. Lonardi used the quote "neither victors nor vanquished", which was used by Justo José de Urquiza after deposing Rosas in the battle of Caseros. The official perspective was that Perón was "the second tyranny", the first one being Rosas; and that both ones should be equally rejected and conversely both governments that ousted them should be praised. For this end, they draw the line of historical continuity "May – Caseros – Libertadora", matching the coup with the May Revolution and the defeat of Rosas. This approach backfired. Perón was highly popular and the military coup unpopular, so Peronists embraced the comparison established between Rosas and Perón, but viewing him with a positive light instead. Nationalist historians draw then their own line of historical continuity "San Martín – Rosas – Perón".

The absence of Perón, who lived for 16 years in exile in Francoist Spain, is an important key to understanding Peronism. After he went into exile, he could be invoked by a variety of Argentine sectors opposed to the current state of affairs. In particular, the personality cult of Eva Perón was conserved by supporters while despised by the "national bourgeoisie". In the 1960s, John William Cooke's writings became an important source of left-wing revolutionary Peronism. Left-wing Peronism was represented by many organizations, from the Montoneros and the Fuerzas Armadas Peronistas to the Peronist Youth, the Frente Revolucionario Peronista and the Revolutionary Peronist Youth, passing by Peronismo en Lucha or Peronismo de Base.

On the other hand, older Peronists formed the base of the orthodox bureaucracy, represented by the Unión Obrera Metalúrgica (Augusto Vandor, famous for his 1965 slogan "For a Peronism without Perón" and declaring as well that "to save Perón, one has to be against Perón", or José Ignacio Rucci). Another current was formed by the "62 Organizaciones 'De pie junto a Perón'", led by José Alonso and opposed to the right-wing Peronist unionist movement. In the early 1970s, left-wing Peronism rejected liberal democracy and political pluralism as the mask of bourgeois domination. The anti-communist right-wing Peronism also rejected it in the name of corporatism, claiming to return to a "Christian and humanist, popular, national socialism".

Perón restored 
By 1970, many groups from opposite sides of the political spectrum had come to support Perón, from the left-wing and Catholic Montoneros to the fascist-leaning and strongly antisemitic Tacuara Nationalist Movement, one of Argentina's first guerrilla movements. In March 1973, Héctor José Cámpora, who had been named as Perón's personal delegate, was elected President of Argentina, paving the way for the return of Perón from Spain. A few months after Perón's return and the subsequent Ezeiza massacre during which the Peronist Left and Right violently clashed, new elections were held in September with Perón elected president and his third wife Isabel vice president.

José Cámpora, a left-wing Peronist, had been replaced temporarily by interim President Raúl Alberto Lastiri while Perón had chosen to openly support the Peronist right. On 1 October 1973, Senator Humberto Martiarena, who was the national secretary of the Superior Council of the National Justicialist Movement, publicized a document giving directives to confront "subversives, terrorist and Marxist groups" which had allegedly initiated a "war" inside the Peronist organizations. From then on, the Superior Council took a firm grip on the Peronist organizations to expel the Left from it.

On that same day, a meeting took place among President Raúl Lastiri, Interior Minister Benito Llambí, Social Welfare Minister José López Rega, general secretary of the Presidency José Humberto Martiarena and various provincial governors, which has been alleged to have been the foundational act of the Argentine Anticommunist Alliance, orthodox peronist and  death squad.

Perón's health was failing throughout his third and final term, which ended abruptly with his death and the succession of his wife to the presidency on 1 July 1974, but she was ousted by the military in another coup d'état in 1976, paving the way for the ensuing dictatorship's '"National Reorganization Process" and the subsequent "Dirty War" against everyone deemed subversive, especially leftists, including left-wing Peronists.

Menem years 
The official Peronist party is the Justicialist Party (PJ), which was the only Peronist party for a long time. During the government of Carlos Menem, a group of legislators led by Carlos Álvarez known as the "Group of 8" left the party, claiming that the government was not following Peronist doctrines. They created a new party, the Broad Front.

A short time later, José Octavio Bordón left the PJ as well, fearing that he might lose a primary election against Menem and thus he created his own party to take part in the 1995 elections and allied with Álvarez' Broad Front in the Front for a Country in Solidarity (Frepaso) coalition. Similar breakaway movements followed frequently after that, creating many small parties which were led by single politicians claiming to be the authentic inheritors of Peronism.

Kirchnerism 

The PJ did not participate as such during the 2003 elections. The party allowed all three precandidates to run for the general elections, using small parties created for that purpose. Néstor Kirchner won the elections running on a Front for Victory ticket. As he did not disband his party after the election, Kirchnerism relies on both the PJ and the Front for Victory.

See also 
 Argentine nationalism
 Justicialist Party
 Kemalism
 Operation Condor
 Secular religion

Notes

References

Bibliography 
Tomas Eloy Martinez, El Sueño Argentino' (The Argentine Dream, 1999) and Memorias del General'' (Memoirs of the General, 1996). 
Daniel James, Resistance and Integration: Peronism and the Argentine Working Class, 1946–1979. NY: Cambridge University Press, 1988. 
Félix Luna, Perón y Su Tiempo, Vol I–III.: Sudamericana, 1990.

External links 

 
Argentine nationalism
Socialism in Argentina
Justicialist Party
Eponymous political ideologies
Labour movement
Economic nationalism
Paternalistic conservatism
Political theories
Cults of personality
Populism
Types of socialism
Conservatism in Argentina
State ideologies
Syncretic political movements